Flight International is a monthly magazine focused on aerospace. Published in the United Kingdom and founded in 1909 as "A Journal devoted to the Interests, Practice, and Progress of Aerial Locomotion and Transport", it is the world's oldest continuously published aviation news magazine.

Flight International is published by DVV Media Group. Competitors include Jane's Information Group and Aviation Week.  Former editors of, and contributors include H. F. King, Bill Gunston, John W. R. Taylor and David Learmount.

History
The founder and first editor of Flight was Stanley Spooner. He was also the creator and editor of The Automotor Journal, originally titled The Automotor Journal and Horseless Vehicle. From around 1900 the journal had a separate section relating to aviation and aeronautical matters. The 5 April 1908 issue of The Automotor Jornal included a diagram of patent drawings of a plane made by the Wright Brothers. Stanley kept in contact with them via his friend Griffith Brewer.
Eventually, Spooner decided that a journal focused solely on matters relating to flying should be published—and so, Flight magazine was established as an offshoot of The Automotor Journal.

Claiming to be the first aeronautical weekly in the world, Flight first appeared on 2 January 1909 as the official journal of the Aero Club of the United Kingdom (later the Royal Aero Club). In April 1934, Flight was acquired by Iliffe & Sons, who were proprietors and printers of technical magazines, one of which included Autocar. On 4 January 1962 the magazine was renamed Flight International.

In August 2019, Flight International and its associated divisions (except analytics and consulting divisions, which were retained by RELX as Cirium) were sold to DVV Media Group. In September 2020, Flight International switched from a weekly to monthly publication.

See also
 FlightGlobal
 Aviation Week & Space Technology, a similar aerospace sector industry magazine

Notes

References

External links
 DVV Media International
 Flight archives Flightglobal.com
 Aerospace illustrations ("cutaways") on Flight International's website (snapshot of site from December 2012)
 Archived Flight International magazines on the Internet Archive

Aerospace industry in the United Kingdom
Aviation magazines
English-language magazines
Magazines established in 1909
Monthly magazines published in the United Kingdom
Transport magazines published in the United Kingdom
1909 establishments in England